Konrad von Lützelhardt was a German noble and Margrave of Ancona in the 12th century.

Biography 
Konrad von Lützelhardt came from the family of Ministerialis of Lützelhardt in Swabia, loyal to the German Emperor. 

When the Sicilian nobles elevated Tankred of Lecce to King of Sicily in 1190, Conrad supported the claims of Henry VI, Holy Roman Emperor on the Sicilian throne by force of arms.

In 1177, he was made Margrave of Ancona. In 1192 Konrad failed to defend Capua against Richard, Count of Acerra. At the same time, Konrad was active as the imperial administrator of Etruria. 

In 1193, he took over command of the campaign against Tankred in Apulia and also in the following year he led the Swabian contingent of Henry VI's army in Italy. In 1195, the Emperor made him Count of Molise. He died in 1197. 

His adversaries gave him the nickname Musca in cerebro (Italian : Muscaincervello, whichs means fly in the brain), because “eo quod plerumque quasi demens
videretur” (he usually looked pretty crazy).

Sources 
 Peter Csendes: Heinrich VI., Primus Verlag Darmstadt 1993. ISBN 3-89678-023-9
 Alemannische Seiten.de¨

Counts of Italy
12th-century German nobility
12th-century births
1197 deaths